El Nasr Girls' College (EGC) is a school in Shatby, Alexandria, Egypt. It was established in 1935, and was originally known as English Girls College.

History 
The college was founded in 1935 to commemorate the Silver Jubilee of King George V, King of England during the time when Egypt was one of the colonies of the United Kingdom.

The buildings were designed by the English architect George Grey Wornum in a “Spanish – Arabic style of architecture” to accommodate a maximum of 1000 pupils. The buildings stood in over 20 feddans of land donated by the Governorate of Alexandria. The school site went up to the main Boulevard "Abu Keir Avenue". The Minister of Education donated a big section to the faculty of science, which stands there today.

Aim 
It followed the British system of education for a very select group of girls. It was run on the lines of an English public school. Students studied for Oxford and Cambridge examinations, and played British games.

Until 1956 the staff were all British, but they were expelled as a result of the Suez crisis of 1956.

Notable alumnae
 Queen Sofía of Spain
 Reem Bassiouney, author and professor of sociolinguistics
 Marwa Ali El-Sherbini, pharmacist
 Donna Francesca Cavalli Hanem
 Shrouk Elbarsiky, Egypt's Ambassador and Permanent Representative to the United Nations

See also 

 Educational institutions in Alexandria
 Education in Egypt
 El Nasr Boys' School

References 

Education in Alexandria
Schools in Alexandria
Schools in Egypt
Girls' schools in Egypt
Educational institutions established in 1935
1935 establishments in Egypt